The Vanderbilt Commodores men's basketball team represents Vanderbilt University in the Southeastern Conference (SEC). The Commodores have won three SEC regular-season titles (1965, 1974 and 1993) and two SEC Tournament championships (1951 and 2012). They have competed in 15 NCAA Tournaments, making it to the Elite Eight once (1965) and the Sweet Sixteen six times (1965, 1974, 1988, 1993, 2004, and 2007). Vanderbilt has played in 13 National Invitation Tournaments, winning it in 1990 and finishing runners-up in 1994.

Memorial Gymnasium

The Commodores play their home games in Memorial Gymnasium. Memorial Gymnasium was built in the early 1950s. It was dedicated as the campus memorial to students and alumni killed in World War II; a plaque commemorating those who died is displayed in the gym's north lobby.

At the time of the gym's construction, there was a serious discussion within the Vanderbilt community about whether the school should de-emphasize intercollegiate athletics and refocus on its academic program.  As a compromise between those who advocated increased athletics competition and those who argued in favor of de-emphasis, the gymnasium was built to hold only about 9,000 seats, and it would be readily adaptable to other uses—significantly, as a possible concert hall.

Consequently, the gymnasium floor was built up above its surroundings, more in the nature of a stage. The areas out of bounds along the sidelines were very wide, in contrast with the small facility which it replaced, where the walls were right along the sidelines and players could scrape their shoulders bringing the ball up the court. This necessitated the placement of the benches at the end of the court, which was not highly unusual at the time.

In addition, each goal was anchored by two far-reaching beams attached to support columns, with extra support coming from cables stretching all the way to the gym's ceiling. In the case of a backboard shatter or beam fracture, replacing these goals would be highly difficult, compared to the usual goal setup at most venues.

Memorial Gym is well known for its unusual design.  The end-of-the-floor bench location is now unique in major college basketball, and SEC coaches who travel to Memorial, along with coaches from other schools who have played at Vanderbilt as a post-season venue, have said that the unusual setup gives Vanderbilt a tremendous home court advantage, since no other facility in which opponents play is arranged in such a way.

Year-by-year season records

Note: Fansonly.com reports Vanderbilt's overall record in 1937–38 as 9–12, while SECSports.com reports it as 10–11.

Source: Soconsports.com

Source: SECSports.com

Source: Fansonly.com

Vanderbilt coaching record

Conference championships 
Vanderbilt has won 4 conference season championships and 3 conference tournament championships.

First college basketball game played 
Vanderbilt defeated Nashville YMCA in a score of 9-6, on 7 February 1893, in the first ever college basketball game played in history.

Retired numbers 

Only three male Commodores have had their jerseys retired by the university:

 Clyde Lee was perhaps the greatest player in Commodore history. He averaged the most points per game in school history and the balconies on the south end of Memorial Gymnasium are commonly referred to as the "balconies that Clyde built".
 Perry Wallace was the first African-American basketball player in the Southeastern Conference, and the first African American to compete in the SEC for his entire period of athletic eligibility.

Postseason

NCAA tournament results
The Commodores have appeared in the NCAA tournament 15 times. Their combined record is 10–16.

NIT results
The Commodores have appeared in the National Invitation Tournament (NIT) 14 times. Their combined record is 23–12. They were NIT champions in 1990.

All-Americans

Source: VUCommodores.com

SEC Players of the Year

Source: VUCommodores.com

Academic All-Americans

Olympians
Jeff Turner- won the gold medal in men's basketball as a member of Team USA at the 1984 Summer Olympics in Los Angeles.

Other notable players

 Wade Baldwin IV (born 1996), basketball player for Maccabi Tel Aviv of the Israeli Basketball Premier League
 Darius Garland (born 2000), basketball player for the Cleveland Cavaliers; All-star (2022)
 Simisola Shittu (born 1999), British-born Canadian basketball player for Ironi Ness Ziona of the Israeli Basketball Premier League
Payton Willis (born 1998), basketball player in the Israeli Basketball Premier League

Vanderbilt alums coaching in college basketball
James Strong – Class of 2000, currently at Vanderbilt University
Martin Bahar – Class of 2006, currently at The University of San Diego
Darshawn McClellan - Class of 2011, currently at University of Texas at El Paso
Sam Ferry - Class of 2010, currently at College of the Holy Cross

Coaching awards
Kevin Stallings – SEC Coach of the Year 2007 and 2010
Eddie Fogler – 1993 National Coach of the Year by AP, UPI, CBS, USBWA, Scripps-Howard, Sports Illustrated, Sporting News, Basketball Weekly
C. M. Newton – SEC Coach of the Year, 1988 and 1989
Wayne Dobbs – SEC Coach of the Year, 1979
Roy Skinner – SEC Coach of the Year, 1965, 1967, 1974, and 1976

All-time leaders

Totals current as of March 15, 2012.

Points

Points per game (min 50 games)

Rebounds

Assists

Steals

Blocks

Source: 2015–16 Vanderbilt Commodores Media Guide

Footnotes

References

External links